Chambal Ki Raani is a 1979 Bollywood action film directed by Radhakant. The film stars Mahendra Sandhu, Amjad Khan and Dara Singh.

Cast
Mahendra Sandhu   
Dara Singh   
Chand Usmani   
Amjad Khan   
Bindu   
Kamal Kapoor   
Urmila Bhatt   
Narendra Nath   
Jagdeep
Rajan Haksar

Soundtrack

References

External links
 

1979 films
1970s Hindi-language films
Indian crime action films
1970s crime action films